The Health (Preservation and Protection and other Emergency Measures in the Public Interest) Act 2020 (Act No. 1 of 2020; previously the Health (Preservation and Protection and other Emergency Measures in the Public Interest) Bill 2020, Bill No. 3 of 2020) was an Act of the Oireachtas (Irish parliament) which provided for additional powers for the state in the extraordinary circumstances of the spread of the COVID-19 pandemic.

Owing to social distancing measures required to combat the virus, and at the written request of Ceann Comhairle Seán Ó Fearghaíl, the Dáil sitting to discuss the legislation on 19 March was limited to 48 TDs (11 each representing Fianna Fáil, Fine Gael and Sinn Féin, four Greens, three members of the Regional Group and two members of all other parties and groups). The legislation passed all stages, and, following requests by opposition TDs, included a sunset provision for review in November. On 20 March, Seanad Éireann – also sitting in reduced numbers – passed the legislation after a three-hour debate. President Michael D. Higgins signed the legislation into law later that day, giving the state the power to detain people, restrict travel and keep people in their homes in order to restrict the pandemic.

This preceded the passing of the Emergency Measures in the Public Interest (COVID-19) Act 2020 by one week.

On 7 April, Minister for Health Simon Harris signed regulations under provisions inserted in the Act, to restrict movement of persons and the holding of events, effective 8 April to 12 April. This move, which Harris confirmed on Prime Time, gave gardaí extra powers to coincide with the Easter period. Harris signed the regulations after meeting Garda Commissioner Drew Harris and Attorney General Séamus Woulfe, with the delay attributed to governmental lawyer indecision over precise wording and exact nature of the powers.

The regulations that were in force included the Health Act 1947 (Section 31A – Temporary Restrictions) (Covid-19) (No. 10) Regulations 2020, which were repeatedly extended.

The Act expired at midnight on 31 March 2022.

See also
 List of COVID-19 pandemic legislation

References

Sources

Citations

2020 in Irish law
Acts of the Oireachtas of the 2020s
COVID-19 pandemic in the Republic of Ireland
Law associated with the COVID-19 pandemic